Batié is a town located in the province of Noumbiel in Burkina Faso. It is the capital of Noumbiel Province and has a population of 17,997 (2019).

References

Populated places in the Sud-Ouest Region (Burkina Faso)